Spytek of Tarnów and Jarosław ( or ;  1367 – 1435) was a Polish nobleman (szlachcic).

Spytek was owner of Jarosław and Bełżyce. He became General Starost of Ruthenia in 1422 and voivode of the Sandomierz Voivodeship in 1433.

Like his brother Jan, Spytek commanded one of the Leliwa clan banners at the Battle of Grunwald in 1410.

He was married to Sandochna ze Zgłobienia and had four children: Jan Tarnowski-Jarosławski, Rafał Tarnowski-Jarosławski, Spytek Tarnowski-Jarosławski and Jadwiga Tarnowska-Jarosławska.

Jan started a new branch of the family, called the "Leliwita branch".

1360s births
1435 deaths
14th-century Polish nobility
People in the Battle of Grunwald
Starost of Leżajsk
Spytek of Tarnow and Jaroslaw
15th-century Polish nobility